Seraphin R. Léger (August 28, 1870 – May 15, 1935) was a Canadian politician. He served in the Legislative Assembly of New Brunswick as member of the Liberal party representing Gloucester County from 1917 to 1935.

References

20th-century Canadian politicians
1870 births
1935 deaths
New Brunswick Liberal Association MLAs